Hillary Lee Lindsey is an American singer-songwriter. She has written songs with or for a number of artists including Michelle Branch, Faith Hill, Martina McBride, Shakira, Lady A, Gary Allan, Sara Evans, Carrie Underwood, Kellie Pickler, Bon Jovi, Taylor Swift, Lady Gaga, Tim McGraw and Luke Bryan. In 2006 and 2016, respectively, Lindsey won a Grammy Award for Best Country Song for Carrie Underwood's "Jesus, Take the Wheel" and for Little Big Town's "Girl Crush". In 2011, Lindsey received an Academy Award nomination for "Coming Home", recorded by Gwyneth Paltrow for the soundtrack of Country Strong, in the Best Original Song category. "Coming Home" also received a Golden Globe nomination that same year for Best Original Song along with "There's a Place for Us", making Lindsey a double nominee in 2011. , she has had 20 number-one singles as a writer.

She has been nominated three times for the Grammy Award for Song of the Year for her work on "Jesus Take the Wheel", "Girl Crush", and "Always Remember Us This Way".

Early life and education 
Lindsey grew up in Washington, Georgia. She is the daughter of Ricky and Kathy Lindsey. Her father was a drummer.

She started writing songs at age two. She went on to sing in her church choir and won her first award at age eight in the local Kiwanis Talent Showcase. As a child, she won 4-H singing competitions and participated in 4-H’s traveling performing arts group, Clovers & Co.

Lindsey graduated from Washington-Wilkes Comprehensive High School and moved to Nashville in 1994 to enroll in Belmont University’s Music Business School.

Career
She landed a publishing deal during her senior year at Belmont University. She signed her first publishing deal in 1997. She was later signed as an artist to Sony Music but was dropped by the label after three months.

She tells the story of a roommate who had an internship at a record label and took one of her tapes into work with her. The tape was passed around to publishers, and Lindsey was quickly signed to Famous Music Publishing. In her first year as a writer she had eight cuts. She had her first number one song as a writer in 2002 with Martina McBride's "Blessed". In that same year, her song This Mystery (co-written by Troy Verges and Brett James) was a number one hit in the Netherlands for singer Marco Borsato in a Dutch translation titled Lopen op het Water ("Walking on water"). The Dutch translation was recorded for the marriage of then-crown prince Willem Alexander and Maxima Zorreguieta.

Eleven of her number ones as a writer are Carrie Underwood tracks including "Jesus Take The Wheel", "Wasted", "So Small", "Just A Dream", "Last Name" and "Two Black Cadillacs". Thirty million records have been sold featuring her compositions. She has had two songs featured on the ABC television series Nashville: "Telescope" performed by Hayden Panettiere and "Change Your Mind" performed by Clare Bowen and Sam Palladio.

In 2020, Lindsey was named Songwriter of the Year by the Academy of Country Music. She is only the second woman in history to receive that honor.

Lindsey's friendship with songwriters Lori McKenna and Liz Rose developed into a working partnership called the Love Junkies. The three have collaborated on songs for Little Big Town and Lady Gaga. The three shared a Grammy Award in 2015 for Girl Crush which won for "Best Country Song." In 2021, the three women launched a podcast titled "Love Junkies Radio." As of 2016, the three women had sold more than 50 million songs either together, separately or with others.

in 2020, Lindsey signed a co-publishing agreement with Concord Music Publishing. The partnership will include a joint venture to sign and develop new artists.

Discography

Personal life 
Lindsey is married to songwriter Cary Barlowe. The couple have a daughter born in 2015.

She has two sisters, Lauren Lindsey Fowler and Taylor Harris Lindsey. Taylor Lindsey is an executive at Sony Music Nashville.

References

External links 
 Hilary Lindsey biography at BMG Music Publishing

Living people
American women country singers
American country singer-songwriters
Grammy Award winners
People from Washington, Georgia
Country musicians from Georgia (U.S. state)
1977 births
21st-century American women
Singer-songwriters from Georgia (U.S. state)